The PacificSource Civil War Series is a college sports series between the Oregon Ducks and the Oregon State Beavers. The schools started to officially keep track of the overall series at the start of the 1999–2000 school year with the introduction of the Northwest Dodge Dealers Civil War Series. To determine the overall winner, points are awarded to schools depending on the outcomes of Civil War games in various sports. PacificSource will sponsor the series through 2015.

The current point system grants:
3 points to the winner of the football game (worth 2 points prior to the 2008–09 season)
1 point to the winner of each men's basketball game (two games are contested each season for a total of 2 points granted)
1 point to the winner of each women's basketball game (two games are contested each season for a total of 2 points granted)
2 points to the winner of the best of three series in baseball (previously 1 point to the winner of each wrestling dual meet prior the 2008–09 season, when the Ducks dropped wrestling and added baseball)
1 point to the winner of the women's soccer game (.5 points to each school if game ends in a tie)
1 point to the winner of each men's golf match (two matches are contested each season for a total of 2 points granted)
1 point to the winner of each women's golf match (two matches are contested each season for a total of 2 points granted)
2 points to the winner of the best of three series in softball
1 point to the winner of each women's volleyball game (two games are contested each season for a total of 2 points granted)

For a total of 17 total points granted. Postseason matchups do not currently count towards point totals.

The record as of the end of the 2008–2009 school year has the Beavers with 4 wins, the Ducks with 4 wins, and two ties. The winners by year have been:

The all-time point breakdown as of the end of the 2008–09 season is 88.0–85.0 in favor of Oregon State.

See also 
 Oregon–Oregon State rivalry

References

External links
 http://www.thecivilwarseries.com/ 
http://www.facebook.com/TheCivilWarSeries
http://www.oregonlive.com/sites/civilwar/ 

Oregon State Beavers
Oregon Ducks
College sports rivalries in the United States
College sports in Oregon
Sports competitions in Oregon
1999 establishments in Oregon